Bloodlands is a British police procedural BBC television series that premiered on BBC One on 21 February 2021. It was created by Chris Brandon and developed by HTM Television, a joint venture between Hat Trick Productions and the producer Jed Mercurio. The show was renewed for a second series on 14 March 2021, with filming commencing in February 2022.

Bloodlands was filmed mainly in the rural area around Strangford Lough in the east of Northern Ireland.

Cast
 James Nesbitt as DCI Tom Brannick
 Lorcan Cranitch as DCS Jackie Twomey
 Charlene McKenna as DS Niamh McGovern
 Chris Walley as  DC Billy “Birdy” Bird
 Lola Petticrew as Izzy Brannick

Series 1
 Michael Smiley as Justin “Dinger” Bell 
 Susan Lynch as DCI Heather Pentland
 Ian McElhinney as Adam Corry
 Lisa Dwan as Tori Matthews
 Peter Ballance as Patrick Keenan
 Kathy Kiera Clarke as Claire Keenan
 Cara Kelly as Siobhan Harkin
 Caolan Byrne as Ben McFarland
 Valerie Lilley as Linda Corry

Series 2
Victoria Smurfit as Olivia Foyle
Diarmaid Murtagh as Robert Dardis

Reception

Reviews 

The review aggregator Rotten Tomatoes gave the series an 83% approval rating, with an average rating of 6.9/10, based on 24 reviews. The critical consensus reads, "Bloodlands at times threatens to buckle under the weight of its heavy load, but thrilling twists and incredible performances hold steady to create an engaging, challenging viewing experience.” On Metacritic, the series has a weighted average score of 76 out of 100 based on 9 reviews, indicating "generally favourable reviews”.

Abby Robinson, reviewing for Digital Spy, described the opening episode of the drama as "heavily plot-driven, which comes at the expense of character developments" and gave it three out of five. Lucy Mangan of The Guardian, described the drama as "enjoyably dense with enough black humour to let it breathe" and gave it four out of five. Ed Power said the first episode of the series was "So grim – and a seriously bad advertisement for a weekend break in Belfast" when reviewing on behalf of The Irish Times, and Lauren Morris, reviewing on behalf of the Radio Times called it "An unpredictable thriller with all the hallmarks of a Jed Mercurio drama".

Awards and nominations

Episodes

Series overview

Series 1 (2021)

Series 2 (2022)

Broadcast
Series 1 was streamed on Acorn TV in the United States and Canada in 2021.  Series 2 was streamed on Acorn TV in February 2023.

References

External links

Bloodlands trailer from the BBC

2021 British television series debuts
2020s British crime drama television series
BBC television dramas
English-language television shows
Television series by Hat Trick Productions
Television shows filmed in Northern Ireland
Television shows set in Northern Ireland